The January 1961 nor'easter was a significant winter storm that impacted the Mid-Atlantic and New England regions of the United States. It was the second of three major snowstorms during the 1960–1961 winter. The storm ranked as Category 3, or "major", on the Northeast Snowfall Impact Scale.

Synoptic history
The storm was preceded by a cold front that brought cold air, associated with an area of high pressure north of the Great Lakes, into the area. The low pressure system quickly moved towards the East Coast on January 19 from the southern United States. Its track was unusually far north, passing through the mid-Ohio Valley. The low tracked from Tennessee to the southern Appalachian Mountains, and moved off the coast of Virginia. It rapidly strengthened; from 0000 UTC to 1200 UTC on January 20, it intensified from 996 millibars to 972 mb. The storm's intensification was accompanied by an increase in the precipitation. It ultimately moved northeastward along the coast and reached its lowest barometric pressure of 964 mb late on January 20, while situated east of New England.

Widespread heavy snow fell from West Virginia and Virginia through Massachusetts and southern New Hampshire, with lighter amounts spreading into Maine. Snowfall amounts were similar to that of a winter storm in February 1958. Following the storm, an anticyclone in the central United States maintained the cold air.

Impact
The nor'easter is sometimes referred to as the Kennedy Inaugural Snowstorm, since it struck on the eve of the inauguration of John F. Kennedy. In advance of the storm, the Weather Bureau predicted a mix of rain and snow in Washington, D.C., but instead, the precipitation remained frozen. The unexpected snowfall resulted in "chaos", and thousands of cars were marooned or abandoned, triggering massive traffic jams. According to the U.S. Army Corps of Engineers, "The Engineers teamed up with more than 1,000 District of Columbia employees to clear the inaugural parade route. Luckily much equipment and some men had been pre-positioned and were ready to go. In the end the task force employed hundreds of dump trucks, front-end loaders, sanders, plows, rotaries, and flamethrowers to clear the way." The snowstorm prevented former President Herbert Hoover from flying into Washington National Airport and attending Kennedy's swearing-in ceremony.
Additionally, the storm dealt the final blow to the Texas Tower #4, a USAF radar installation in the Atlantic Ocean, causing her to sink with the loss of all 28 crew aboard.

See also

Climate of the United States
List of NESIS storms

References

 

Nor'easters
1961 meteorology
1961 in Washington, D.C.
Natural disasters in Washington, D.C.
1961 natural disasters in the United States